The Greatest & Rarest is the first "greatest hits" album by the Christian third-wave ska band, The Insyderz. The album was released in 2001 and re-released in 2003 as Peace of God.

Track listing
 "Here We Come" (Previously Unreleased)
 "Jigsaw" (Single Mix Never Before Available On CD)
 "Carnival"
 "Trigger Happy"
 "The Hunted"
 "Walking Dead"
 "Enthos"
 "Paradise" (Single Mix Never Before Available On CD)
 "Awesome God"
 "Peace Of God"
 "I Could Sing Of Your Love"
 "He Has Made Me Glad"
 "Shout To The Lord"
 "Who Is This?"
 "Oh Lord- You're Beautiful"
 "Walking On Sunshine" (Previously Unreleased)
 "Only A Sailor Knows" (From Surfonic Water Revival)
 "Our Wars" ('B' Side Of CD Single)
 "Memorial Song"
 "Forgive And Forget"
 "Manual Transmission"

The Insyderz albums
2001 greatest hits albums